Al-Anon Family Groups, founded in 1951, is an international mutual aid organization for people who have been impacted by another person's alcoholism. In the organization's own words, Al-Anon is a "worldwide fellowship that offers a program of recovery for the families and friends of alcoholics, whether or not the alcoholic recognizes the existence of a drinking problem or seeks help."
Alateen "is part of the Al-Anon fellowship designed for the younger relatives and friends of alcoholics through the teen years".

Background 
Al-Anon defines itself as an independent fellowship with the stated purpose of helping relatives and friends of alcoholics. According to the organization, alcoholism is a family illness. Its "Preamble to the Twelve Steps" provides a general description:

Not an intervention program, Al-Anon does not have the stated primary purpose of arresting another's compulsive drinking. Members meet in groups. Meetings are usually small (five to twenty-five); in larger meetings, members often split into smaller groups after the opening readings so everyone has a chance to speak.

Many Al-Anon family group meetings begin with the "Suggested Al-Anon/Alateen Welcome", which starts:

History 
Al-Anon was co-founded in 1951, 16 years after the founding of Alcoholics Anonymous on June 10, 1935, by Anne B. and Lois W. (wife of AA co-founder Bill W.). Before the formation of Al-Anon, independent groups of families of alcoholics met. "Bill thought the[se] groups could be consolidated and that Lois should be the one to take it on."

Al-Anon adopted the Twelve Steps of Alcoholics Anonymous for their use "word for word with the exception of the Twelfth Step", changing the word "alcoholics" to "others" ("we tried to carry this message to others"). Its name derives from the first parts of the words "Alcoholics Anonymous". Alateen, part of Al-Anon, began in California in 1957 when a teenager named Bob "joined with five other young people who had been affected by the alcoholism of a family member."

Purpose 
Although people commonly turn to Al-Anon for help in stopping another's drinking, the organization recognizes that the friends and families of alcoholics are often traumatized themselves and in need of emotional support and understanding. According to Lois W.:

Benefits

Problems 
Al-Anon/Alateen literature focuses on problems common to family members and friends of alcoholics such as excessive care-taking, an inability to differentiate between love versus pity and loyalty to abusers, rather than the problems of the alcoholic.
The organization acknowledges that members may join with low self-esteem, largely a side-effect of unrealistically overestimating their agency and control: attempting to control another person's drinking behavior and, when they fail, blaming themselves for the other person's behavior.

Improvement 
Participation in Al-Anon has been associated with less personal blame by women who, as a whole, engage in more initial personal blame for the drinking than men. Family members of alcoholics begin to improve as they learn to recognize family pathology, assign responsibility for the pathology to a disease, forgive themselves, accept that they were adversely affected by the pathology and learn to accept their family members' shortcomings.

Al-Anon members are encouraged to keep the focus on themselves, rather than on the alcoholic. Although members believe that changed attitudes can aid recovery, they stress that one person did not cause, cannot cure and cannot control another person's alcohol-related choices and behaviors.

Treatment of alcoholism 
Al-Anon's primary purpose is to help families and friends of alcoholics, rather than stopping alcoholism in others or assisting with interventions. When an alcoholic's spouse is active in Al-Anon and the alcoholic is active in AA, the alcoholic is more likely to be abstinent, marital happiness is more likely to be increased and parenting by both is more likely to improve.

A 1999 clinical analysis of methods used by concerned significant others (CSOs) to encourage alcoholics to seek treatment indicated that Al-Anon participation was "mostly ineffective" towards this goal. The psychologists found community reinforcement approach and family training (CRAFT) "significantly more" effective than Al-Anon participation in arresting alcoholism in others.

Demographics 
In 2015, Al-Anon Family Groups published its 2015 Member Survey Results of demographic and other information from Al-Anon members in Canada and the United States Of the 8,517 respondents, 93 percent identified as white, 83 percent as female and 61 percent as married. Twelve percent of the respondents had children under age 18 at home, while "80 percent of respondents have been in a romantic relationship involving an alcoholic partner". And one side finding was that "40 percent of respondents initially joined Al-Anon because a person with a drug problem was negatively affecting their lives".

For the 2006 Alateen Member Survey, conducted in the U.S., 139 Alateen members responded. Sixty-five percent of the respondents were female, 35 percent were male, 72 percent were white and 20 percent spoke Spanish fluently. The respondents' average age was 14.

Structure 

The structure of Al-Anon Family Groups may be depicted as an inverted pyramid, with the organization's headquarters (the World Service Office) at the bottom and the "autonomous" groups at the top.

Groups
Al-Anon and Alateen members meet in Groups for fellowship and support. Each Group may elect a Group Representative (GR) to represent a group at District meetings.

Districts  
Al-Anon and Alateen Groups' Group Representatives (GRs) attend District meetings. At these meetings they discuss service activities, Group issues ( their primary purpose being to  be a forum for Groups) and information from their Area and the World Service Office (WSO) of Al-Anon and Alateen, with GRs having voting privileges. A District may host regular events, such as workshops and speaker meetings, for the local fellowship.

Areas  
An Area comprises several Districts. (For example, Texas is divided into two Al-Anon and Alateen Areas, East and West. Each Texas Area has about a dozen Al-Anon and Alateen Districts, for a total of about 24 in the state.) Each Area has regular meetings (known as Assemblies) where Group Representatives (GRs) meet and vote on issues impacting that Area, host workshops and speakers and get Area information to bring back to their Groups.

World Service 
At Area Assembly, GRs elect a Delegate to the annual World Service Conference (WSC). The WSC meets annually to interface with the World Service Office (WSO), which is managed by administrators and overseen by the Board of Trustees (who meet more regularly themselves).

Democracy and accountability 
Al-Anon promotes democracy and accountability. According to one of its General Warranties of the Conference, "That though the Conference serves Al-Anon it shall never perform any act of government; and that like the fellowship of Al-Anon Family Groups which it serves, it shall always remain democratic in thought and action." Another states "That no Conference member shall be placed in unqualified authority over other members."

According to Tradition Two of Al-Anon's Twelve Traditions: "Our leaders are but trusted servants—they do not govern." Tradition Nine says: "Our groups, as such, ought never be organized; but we may create service boards or committees directly responsible to those they serve." Districts and Areas are directly responsible to the Groups.

The World Service Office (WSO) is accountable to the World Service Conference (WSC). The WSC is responsible to the Areas through elected Delegates and ultimately responsible to the Groups. According to Concept One of Al-Anon's Twelve Concepts of Service: "The ultimate responsibility and authority for Al-Anon world services belongs to the Al-Anon Groups."

In film
When Love Is Not Enough: The Lois Wilson Story is a 2010 film about the wife of AA co-founder Bill Wilson and the beginnings of AA and Al-Anon.

See also 
 Adult Children of Alcoholics
 Alcoholics Anonymous
 Alcoholism in family systems
 Community Reinforcement and Family Training (CRAFT)
 List of twelve-step groups
 Nar-Anon
 National Association for Children of Alcoholics
 National Council on Alcoholism and Drug Dependence

References

Further reading

External links 

 
 First Steps to Al-Anon Recovery
 Al-Anon/Alateen official website (UK and Eire)
 Al-Anon/Alateen Literature Distribution Center
 
 Adult Children of Alcoholics in Arizona

Twelve-step programs
Organizations established in 1951
Health charities in the United States
Alcohol abuse
1951 establishments in the United States
Charities based in Virginia
Medical and health organizations based in Virginia